No. 578 Squadron RAF was a heavy bomber squadron of the Royal Air Force during the Second World War.

History
578 Squadron was formed at RAF Snaith, East Riding of Yorkshire on 14 January 1944 from 'C' flight of No. 51 Squadron RAF, equipped with Halifax Mk.III bombers, as part of No. 4 Group RAF in Bomber Command. It transferred to RAF Burn, North Yorkshire in February, and was disbanded there on 15 April 1945. The squadron carried out 2,721 operational sorties with the Halifax for a loss 40 aircraft.

Notable squadron members
The first commanding officer was W/Cdr. D.S.S. Wilkerson, DSO, DFC and the aircrew included Pilot Officer Cyril Joe Barton, VC.

Aircraft operated

Notable aircraft
Two of the Halifaxes of 578 squadron passed the century mark and flew more than 100 operational sorties:

Squadron bases

References

Notes

Bibliography

Further reading

 Adams, Chuck. 578 Squadron Operations, 1944–45. self-published, 1983.
 Cawdron, Hugh. Based at Burn – 578 Sqn airmen recall.... Middlesex: Hugh Cawdron/578 Burn Association,1995
 Cawdron, Hugh. Based at Burn Mk.II: After 50 Years the Biography of an Outstanding Airman and a Diary of the Bomber Squadron he Founded and Commanded. Bristol: Hugh Cawdron/578 Burn Association, 2001. .
 Marshall, Ken. The Pendulum and the Scythe: A History of No.4 Group Bomber Command. Walton-on-Thames, Surrey, UK: Air Research Publications, 1996. .
 Ward, Chris. Royal Air Force Bomber Command Squadron Profiles: 578 Squadron – "Accuracy" (Bomber Command Profile no. 113). Lutterworth, Berkshire, UK: Ward Publishing, 1998.

External links

 578 Squadron Association
 Squadron history on RAF website
 No. 578 Squadron RAF movement and equipment history
 Squadron histories for nos. 541–598 squadron on RAFweb's 

578 Squadron
Military units and formations established in 1944
Military units and formations disestablished in 1945